Fimbrios is a genus of snakes of the family Xenodermidae.

Geographic range
The genus Fimbrios is endemic to Southeast Asia.

Species
The following two species are recognized as being valid.
Fimbrios klossi  – Cambodia, Laos, Vietnam
Fimbrios smithi  – Vietnam

Etymology
The specific names, klossi and smithi, are in honor of English zoologist Cecil Boden Kloss and British herpetologist Malcolm Arthur Smith, respectively.

Morphology
The Fimbrios has distinct morphological characteristics such as: 30 to 35 equal-sized maxillary teeth; head not distinct from neck, covered with large shields; eye small, with vertically subelliptic pupil; nostril in the anterior part of a large concave nasal; loreal very large, extending from the nasal to the eye; rostral being separated from the inter-nasals by a horizontal ridge of tissue; rostral, mental and labials with raised, erected edges; a single pair of enlarged chin shields; body slender, cylindrical, scales elliptical, keeled, in 24 to 33 rows at midbody, those of the outer row enlarged; ventrals large, rounded; subcaudals unpaired; tail moderate.

References

Further reading
Smith MA (1921). "New or Little-known Reptiles and Batrachians from Southern Annam (Indo-China). Proceedings of the Zoological Society of London 1921: 423-440 + Plates I-II. (Fimbrios, new genus, p. 425; F. klossi, new species, p. 425 + Plate I, figure 1).

Xenodermidae
Snake genera
Snakes of Southeast Asia
Taxa named by Malcolm Arthur Smith